The Biological Society of Washington is a worldwide acting scientific organisation established on 3 December 1880 in Washington, D.C., United States. The original purpose was "to encourage the study of the Biological Sciences and to hold meetings at which papers shall be read and discussed." The current primary function is "the furtherance of taxonomic study and the diffusion of taxonomic knowledge."

In May 1882 the first issue of the peer reviewed journal Proceedings of the Biological Society of Washington was published. Since then it appears quarterly. Another journal is the Bulletin of the Biological Society of Washington which is published since 1918 and contains larger studies, symposia proceedings and special study collections. The Biological Society of Washington was among the eight organisations which founded the Washington Academy of Sciences in 1898. The governing council of the society includes the elected officers and selected local members. The first elected president was George Brown Goode and the first recording secretary was Richard Rathbun. Later well-known presidents include Frederick Vernon Coville, Edward William Nelson, Ned Hollister, Clinton Hart Merriam, William Healey Dall, Andrew Delmar Hopkins, Theodore Gill, Barton Warren Evermann, Richard C. Banks, Leonhard Hess Stejneger, and Charles Abiathar White.

The Biological Society of Washington has currently about 250 members, including a number of staff members of the Smithsonian Institution, the United States National Museum as well as members of the USDA and the United States Department of the Interior.

In 2004 the Biological Society of Washington made headlines for the Sternberg peer review controversy when the Proceedings of the Biological Society of Washington published a peer-reviewed paper in support of intelligent design.

See also
Society of Biology
Society for Experimental Biology

References
Washington Academy of Sciences: Directory of the Washington Academy of Sciences and affiliated societies: comprising the Anthropological, Biological, Chemical, Entomological, Geographic, Geological, Historical, Medical, and Philosophical Societies. Washington Academy of Sciences (Washington, D.C.), 1903.
John Warren Aldrich: The Biological Society of Washington: a centennial history 1880-1980. Bulletin of the Biological Society of Washington. No. 4. The Biological Society of Washington, Washington D. C., 1980

External links
Proceedings of the Biological Society of Washington Online Journal Website
Biological Society of Washington, Records, 1880–1890 from the Smithsonian Institution Archives
Biological Society of Washington, Records, circa 1880–1972, also from the Smithsonian Institution Archives
Biological Society of Washington, Records, 1960–2007, again, from the Smithsonian Institution Archives

Biology societies
Scientific societies based in the United States
Organizations based in Washington, D.C.
Scientific organizations established in 1880
1880 establishments in Washington, D.C.